Taylor Armstrong (born Shana Lynette Hughes; June 10, 1971) is an American television personality. She is known as an original cast member of the Bravo reality series, The Real Housewives of Beverly Hills. In 2022, it was announced that she would join The Real Housewives of Orange County, making her the first housewife to transfer franchises.

After starring in the show's first three seasons from 2010 until 2013, Armstrong continued to make guest appearances on the Beverly Hills installment between 2013 and 2016. In June 2022, Armstrong starred in the second season of The Real Housewives Ultimate Girls Trip.

Biography
Armstrong was born Shana Lynette Hughes in Independence, Kansas, on June 10, 1971. Her family later left Kansas for Tulsa, Oklahoma, where Armstrong attended Union High School and was a cheerleader. She graduated in 1989. She later changed her name to Taylor Ford and moved to Beverly Hills, California, after starting her own e-commerce business. She met her future husband, venture capitalist Russell Armstrong, at a local restaurant in Beverly Hills while waiting to be seated. The two married less than a year later and Armstrong gave birth to their only child, a daughter named Kennedy Caroline Armstrong, who was born in 2006.

Armstrong first appeared in the public spotlight in 2010, as part of the cast of the Bravo reality television series The Real Housewives of Beverly Hills. During the series' run, Armstrong's appearance on the show was plagued by rumors of financial issues and domestic violence, and she later confirmed that she had been physically abused by Russell Armstrong and had to undergo reconstructive surgery for an orbital fracture after being hit by him.

In July 2011, after the filming of the second season of Real Housewives, she filed for divorce, citing verbal and physical abuse. The next month, her estranged abusive husband died by suicide; she found his body on August 15, 2011, dead from an apparent hanging, at a home he rented on Mulholland Drive following their separation.

Armstrong is currently married to John Bluher, an attorney, whom she wed on April 4, 2014, in Pacific Palisades, Los Angeles.

In June 2022, Armstrong starred in season two of The Real Housewives Ultimate Girls Trip, which premiered on Peacock. Filming was completed in September 2021 at Dorinda Medley’s Blue Stone Manor in The Berkshires. 

On August 1, 2022, it was announced that Armstrong would be joining The Real Housewives of Orange County as a "friend of the housewives" for the upcoming seventeenth season, making her the first housewife to switch franchises.

Internet meme
In 2019, a screen-capture of Armstrong on the second season of The Real Housewives of Beverly Hills was used in an Internet meme called "woman yelling at a cat". The meme depicts an upset Armstrong during a heated discussion about her husband's alleged abuse juxtaposed with a photograph of a cat named Smudge. Armstrong reacted positively to the meme. She also talked about her relationship with her ex husband.

Filmography

Television

See also

 List of people from California
 List of people from Kansas
 List of people from Tulsa, Oklahoma

References

External links

 , her official website
 
 

1971 births
20th-century American non-fiction writers
20th-century American women writers
21st-century American non-fiction writers
21st-century American women writers
American memoirists
Living people
People from Beverly Hills, California
People from Independence, Kansas
Writers from Tulsa, Oklahoma
Philanthropists from California
Philanthropists from Oklahoma
The Real Housewives cast members
Television personalities from California
American women memoirists
Writers from California
Writers from Kansas